The Gun Runner is a 1969 action movie, the first directing credit for actor turned filmmaker Richard Compton.

See also
 List of American films of 1969

References

External links

1960s exploitation films
1960s English-language films
1960s action films
Films directed by Richard Compton
American action films
American exploitation films
1960s American films